David Sanford may refer to:

David Sanford (attorney), American attorney
David Sanford (composer) (born 1963), American composer and jazz bandleader
David H. Sanford (born 1937), American philosopher